The 1979–80 New York Islanders season was the eighth season in the franchise's history. During the season, the Islanders dropped below the 100-point mark for the first time in five years, earning only 91 points.

Before the playoffs, Torrey made the difficult decision to trade longtime and popular veterans Billy Harris and defenseman Dave Lewis to the Los Angeles Kings for second line center Butch Goring. Goring is often called the "final piece of the puzzle": a strong two-way player, his presence on the second line ensured that opponents would no longer be able to focus their defensive efforts on the Isles' first line of Bossy, Trottier and Clark Gillies. Contributions from new teammates, such as wingers Duane Sutter and Anders Kallur and stay-at-home defensemen Gord Lane and Ken Morrow (the latter fresh off a gold medal win at the 1980 Olympics), also figured prominently in the Islanders' playoff success.

Offseason
Clark Gillies resigns the team captaincy and is replaced by defenceman Denis Potvin.

NHL Draft

Regular season

Season standings

Schedule and results

Pre-season

Regular season

Playoffs
After easily disposing of the Los Angeles Kings and the Boston Bruins in the first two rounds, the Isles faced the Buffalo Sabres in the semi-finals, who had finished second overall in the NHL standings. The Isles won the first two games in Buffalo, including a 3–2 victory in Game 2 on Bob Nystrom's goal in double overtime. They went on to win the series in six games and reach the finals for the first time in franchise history, where they would face the NHL's regular season champions, the Philadelphia Flyers, who had gone undefeated for 35 straight games (25–0–10) during the regular season. In Game 1 in Philadelphia, the Isles won 4–3 on Denis Potvin's power-play goal in overtime. Leading the series 3–2, they went home to Long Island for Game 6. In that game, Bob Nystrom continued his overtime heroics, scoring at 7:11 of the extra frame, on assists by John Tonelli and Lorne Henning, to bring Long Island its first Stanley Cup. It was the Isles' sixth overtime victory of the playoffs. Bryan Trottier won the Conn Smythe Trophy as the most valuable player in the playoffs. Torrey's strategy of building through the draft turned out very well; nearly all of the major contributors on the 1980 champions were home-grown Islanders or had spent most of their NHL careers in the Islanders organization. The Islanders would become the first NHL team to win a Stanley Cup with Europeans (Stefan Persson, Anders Kallur, Bob Nystrom) on its roster.

Stanley Cup
New York Islanders vs. Philadelphia Flyers

New York wins the series 4–2.

Player statistics

Note: Pos = Position; GP = Games played; G = Goals; A = Assists; Pts = Points; +/- = plus/minus; PIM = Penalty minutes; PPG = Power-play goals; SHG = Short-handed goals; GWG = Game-winning goals
      MIN = Minutes played; W = Wins; L = Losses; T = Ties; GA = Goals-against; GAA = Goals-against average; SO = Shutouts;

Awards and records
 Bryan Trottier, Conn Smythe Trophy

Transactions

Farm teams

References

External links
 Islanders on Hockey Database

New York Islanders seasons
New York Islanders
New York Islanders
New York Islanders
New York Islanders
New York Islanders
Stanley Cup championship seasons